A Silence That Screams is the eight album of the Italian heavy metal  band Perseo Miranda, released on 15 December 2010 under the label Erga Editions. The track "In a broken dream" is a cover of Phyton Lee Jackson.

History
The album was recorded in October 2010 and November 2010 at Quake Sound. (Genoa, Italy), but the composition began in April 2010.  The cover and all booklet was made by Matteo Merli for Erga Editions.

Track listing

Personnel
 Perseo Miranda – voice
 Pier Gonella – guitars-bass
 Pino Di Stadio – drums

References

External links
 Perseo Miranda – Official site of the band
 Perseo Miranda – Official myspace site of the band

2010 albums
Perseo Miranda albums